The Blackham Baronetcy, of London, was a title in the Baronetage of England. It was created on 13 April 1696 by King William III for Richard Blackham, a woollen manufacturer and a Turkey merchant. The title became extinct on the death of his son the second Baronet John Blackham in 1728.

Sir Richard Blackham

Sir Richard Blackham was a merchant and woolen manufacturer. His family was 'from Warwickshire and Staffordshire extraction'. An ancestor Benjamin Blackham was made Knight by King Charles I in 1631.

In 1690 Blackham travelled to Ireland with King William III where he was involved in clothing six thousand of Williams soldiers for the Battle of the Boyne. He was also involved with providing ships during the Nine Years War.

In 1696 Blackham signed a contract with Captain Kidd. Kidd was commissioned by William III to set out on a pirate hunting expedition where he was to entitled to receive ten percent of any recovered profits. However, as he needed additional funding for the voyage he made a deal with Blackham. In the agreement Kidd exchanged some of his promised shares in return for money.

Blackham and his wife were apprehended for manufacturing counterfeit coins in 1705. In another instance in the Old Bailey he was found "guilty of Misprision of treason for melting down the coin of England, and making
foreign coins of it".

Blackham was married to Elizabeth Appleyard c.1690, (daughter of Thomas Appleyard and Mary Boynton) with whom he had five children, three died in their infancy (Thomas, Richard and Elizabeth), and two survived (John and Frances).

Sir John Blackham
Sir Richard's son Sir John Blackham survived his father by only three days. The Baronetcy became extinct on his death.

Blackham Baronets, of London (1696)
Sir Richard Blackham, 1st Baronet (died 1728)
Sir John Blackham, 2nd Baronet (died 1728)

References

External links
A secret agreement between pirate hunters, 1696 | Gilder Lehrman Institute of American History
The English Baronets: Being a Genealogical and Historical Account of Their Families ...
Person Page
A Genealogical and Heraldic History of the Extinct and Dormant Baronetcies of England

Extinct baronetcies in the Baronetage of England